Andrea Hahmann (née Lange, born 3 June 1966) is a German former middle-distance runner who represented the GDR. She finished fifth in the 1500m final at the 1987 World Championships, and sixth in the 1500m final at the 1988 Olympic Games.

Career
Born Andrea Lange in Ludwigsfelde, Germany, she finished third in the 1500 metres at the 1987 European Cup in June behind Kirsty Wade and Tatyana Samolenko. Two months later, she ran her lifetime best for the 1500m with 4:00.07 on 22 August in Potsdam, narrowly behind fellow GDR athlete Hildegard Körner who ran 4:00.06. Two weeks later, at the 1987 World Championships in Rome, she finished fifth in the final of the 1500 metres in 4:00.63. The race was won by Samolenko in 3:58.56, with Korner second in 3:58.67.

As Andrea Hahmann, she represented the German Democratic Republic at the 1988 Seoul Olympics, where she reached the 1500m final. In a race won clearly by Romania's Paula Ivan, Hahmann was in strong contention for a medal. With just over 250 metres to go she moved into second place ahead of Romania's Doina Melinte, chased by the Soviet world champion Samolenko, and Britain's Chrissie Cahill. Coming into the home straight some 40m behind Ivan, Hahmann had a three-four metre advantage on the others. She was still in second place 50m from the line, before Samolenko and Cahill passed her. All three were then overtaken by the fast finishing Soviet Laimutė Baikauskaitė, who won the silver medal having been over 10m behind Hahmann with less than 100m to go. Samolenko won the bronze, Cahill was fourth, and Canada's Lynn Williams  edged Hahmann in the final stride for fifth. Hahmann was sixth in 4:00.96.

In 1990, Hahmann won a bronze medal in the 3000 metres at the European Indoor Championships in Glasgow, behind Elly van Hulst and Margareta Keszeg.

International competitions

Personal bests
800 m: 1:57.31 (1987)
1500 m: 4:00.07 (1987)
3000 m: 8:45.00 (1988 indoors)

References

Living people
1966 births
People from Ludwigsfelde
Sportspeople from Brandenburg
East German female middle-distance runners
Olympic athletes of East Germany
Athletes (track and field) at the 1988 Summer Olympics
World Athletics Championships athletes for East Germany
European Athletics Championships medalists